Motrico (1925-c.1951) was a French Thoroughbred racehorse who was the second of seven horses to win the Prix de l'Arc de Triomphe on two occasions.

Named for a coastal town in the province of Guipúzcoa in Spain, Motrico was a descendant through his male line of English Triple Crown champion Flying Fox. He was five years old when he won the 1930 Prix de l'Arc de Triomphe and was then retired to stud duty. Less than successful as a sire,  he was brought back to the race track in 1932 and in the fall became the oldest "Arc" winner when he claimed victory for a second time under jockey Charles Semblat.

The best known of Motrico's offspring was Hanhof, who won the 1944 Grand Steeple-Chase de Paris. A grandson named Vulgan became an important sire of Steeplechase horses. Motrico's last foal was born in 1950.

References
 Motrico's pedigree and partial racing stats

1925 racehorse births
Racehorses bred in France
Racehorses trained in France
Arc winners
Thoroughbred family 3-b